The Judge Franklin Faulkner House, on E. Cherokee St. in Sallisaw, Oklahoma, was built around 1845.  It was listed on the National Register of Historic Places in 1980.

It was a  log cabin.  It was moved in 1956 about six miles to downtown Sallisaw.

It has also been known as Faulkner Cabin.

Relatively recent photo shows a double pen log cabin. However photos from 1979 and 1980 show a single pen cabin.

References

Log cabins
National Register of Historic Places in Sequoyah County, Oklahoma
Buildings and structures completed in 1845